Monument to Balzac is a sculpture by Auguste Rodin in memory of the French novelist Honoré de Balzac. According to Rodin, the sculpture aims to portray the writer's persona rather than a physical likeness. The work was commissioned in 1891 by the Société des Gens de Lettres, a full-size plaster model was displayed in 1898 at a Salon in Champ de Mars. After coming under criticism the model was rejected by the société and Rodin moved it to his home in Meudon. On 2 July 1939 (22 years after the sculptor's death) the model was cast in bronze for the first time and placed on the Boulevard du Montparnasse at the intersection with Boulevard Raspail.

Casts and various studies of the sculpture are today in many different collections including the Ackland Art Museum, Middelheim Open Air Sculpture Museum in Antwerp, The Norton Simon Museum of Art, the Musée Rodin in Meudon, the Rodin Museum in Philadelphia, the Hirshhorn Museum, the Hirschhorn Sculpture Garden (Smithsonian) in Washington D.C, The Metropolitan Museum of Art, the Museum of Modern Art in New York City, the National Gallery of Victoria in Melbourne, the Ashmolean Museum in Oxford, in front of the Van Abbemuseum, Eindhoven, Netherlands, in Caracas, Venezuela in the open spaces around the former Ateneo de Caracas, now UNEARTES and Balzac in the Robe of a Dominican Monk in Museo Soumaya in Mexico City. Today the artwork is sometimes considered the first truly modern sculpture.

In his 1969 documentary series Civilisation, Kenneth Clark said Rodin's statue of Balzac is "the greatest piece of sculpture of the nineteenth century — perhaps, indeed, since Michelangelo," continuing that, "Balzac, with his prodigious understanding of human motives scorns conventional values, defies fashionable opinions, as Beethoven did, and should inspire us to defy all those forces that threaten to impair our humanity: lies, tanks, tear gas, ideologies, opinion polls, mechanisation, planners, computers—the whole lot."

Commission

The Société des Gens de Lettres (Paris, France) considered four different artists for the sculptural work before it was given to Rodin. The first was French neoclassical artist Henri Chapu, however, Chapu died in 1891 before the work could be finalized. Marquet de Vasselot was the next artist considered for the sculpture and provided a bust of the writer for the Societé. At the same time artists Millet and Coutan also applied for the commission.

Rodin was not initially considered for the work because at that point in time, around 1885, his career had not become as prominent. After the death of Chapu, the recently elected president of the Societé, Émile Zola strongly supported Rodin for the job and, so, the artist submitted a proposal to have a completed three-meter statue of the French novelist within an eighteen-month period which was approved.

The commission was in response to the elevated importance of Honoré de Balzac after his death. Balzac was one of the founders of the Societé as well as the second president of the organization. Upon his death in 1850 interest in creating a statue to commemorate the writer quickly developed under the leadership of Alexandre Dumas, père.

Preparation

Instead of the designated eighteen-month period of time, Rodin employed a lengthy seven years to finish the work. Rodin became infatuated with the literature of his subject as well as researched the character and personality of Balzac, similar to the writer's own approach to character development. In preparation for the sculpture, Rodin read the author's works as well as traveled numerous times to the author's hometown of Touraine in order to sketch and model clay portrait studies from individuals with similar likeness to the novelist although Rodin never saw him in person. Rodin had clothes resembling those of the Balzac's made by the writer's former tailor, using a cloak similar to Balzac's writing cloak for his final statue.  The studies ranged from portrait to muscular and elderly nude figures along with humorous and distorted representations with sexual emphasis. Rodin repeatedly studied the cloak as well as different facial features that he derived from his observational studies and limited references including a daguerreotype of Balzac. Each sketch evolved and transformed into a different representation of the novelist varying from phallic nudes to heavily clothed and hidden figures.

In 1894, the Societé threatened to step in legally with the commission, turn the job over to artist Alexandre Falguière and take away Rodin's payment. Yet Rodin continued to ask for extensions on time making over fifty studies and continuously distanced himself from a true physical portrayal, tending towards a more psychological representation. The artist became infatuated with capturing the essence of the author's strength. In a message to writer Charles Chincholle in May 1898, Rodin explained his artistic pursuit:

In The Art of Dramatic Writing, Lajos Egri, perhaps apocryphally, describes the statue as originally having a pair of folded hands. After Rodin's students complimented the hands to the exclusion of the rest of the statue, he removed them, fearing they were overpowering.

Final study

The Final Study for the Monument to Balzac is a smaller version study for the final statue.

Rejection

Finally in 1898, Rodin presented a plaster study of the Balzac statue in the Salon de la Société Nationale des Beaux-Arts. The sculpture was not received well by the critics; Rodin took the negativity as a personal attack. Many disliked the grotesque stature of the figure while others criticized the work as too similar to that of the Italian impressionist Medardo Rosso. As well, reports surfaced before the unveiling of the sculpture regarding anticipated dismay over the final outcome of the artwork. The Société des Gens de Lettres decided to disregard the commissioning of Rodin and not accept the sculpture.

Regardless of rejection from his commissionaires, contemporaries such as Paul Cézanne, Toulouse-Lautrec and Claude Monet supported Rodin in his point of view. Against the rejection a petition was raised  in mid-1898 by supporters in the artistic community, and subscriptions to a fund of 30,000 francs to complete and install the work were raised,  yet in the end, Rodin decidedly declined any bids for the work and kept the plaster artwork in his home at Meudon.

Monumental casts
 France
 Musée Rodin Paris
 at the crossroads of boulevard Raspail and boulevard du Montparnasse, also known as carrefour Vavin, in the 6th arrondissement of Paris (since 1939)
Germany
Japan
Hakone Open-Air Museum
Australia
National Gallery of Victoria (since 1968)

See also
List of sculptures by Auguste Rodin
List of public art in Washington, D.C., Ward 2

References

Further reading

External links
"Auguste Rodin: Final Study of the Monument to Balzac (1984.364.15)". In Heilbrunn Timeline of Art History. New York: The Metropolitan Museum of Art, 2000–. http://www.metmuseum.org/toah/hd/rodn/ho_1984.364.15.htm (October 2006)
Pensive Texts and Thinking Statues: Balzac with Rodin, Naomi Schor, Critical Inquiry, Vol. 27, No. 2 (Winter, 2001), pp. 239–265 _(article consists of 27 pages) Published by: The University of Chicago Press Stable URL: https://www.jstor.org/stable/1344249
Cladel, Judith. Rodin. New York: Hardcourt, Brace and Company, 1937. Print.
Brians, Paul. Naturalism and Realism. 1 Mar. 2006. Web. <http://www.wsu.edu/~brians/hum_303/naturalism.html>.
Tacha Spear, Athena. Rodin Sculpture in the Cleveland Museum of Art. Cleveland Ohio: Cleveland Museum of Art, 1967. Print.
Elsen, Albert E. In Rodin's Studio. Oxford: Phaidon Limited, 1980. Print.
de Caso, Jacques. "Rodin and the Cult of Balzac". Vol. 106. Burlington Magazine Publications, 1964. Print. Ser. 735.

Sculptures by Auguste Rodin
Sculptures of the Musée Rodin
Cultural depictions of Honoré de Balzac
1891 sculptures
Sculptures of men
Bronze sculptures in the United States
Sculptures of the Museum of Modern Art (New York City)
Sculptures of the Smithsonian Institution
Hirshhorn Museum and Sculpture Garden
Outdoor sculptures in Washington, D.C.
Bronze sculptures in France
Outdoor sculptures in France
Statues in France
Bronze sculptures in Belgium
Bronze sculptures in Australia
Statues in Australia
Bronze sculptures in the United Kingdom
Bronze sculptures in the Netherlands
Bronze sculptures in Venezuela
Sculptures of men in France
Sculptures of men in New York City
Sculptures of men in Washington, D.C.
Balzac
Balzac